The 2002 1000 Guineas Stakes was a horse race held at Newmarket Racecourse on Sunday 5 May 2002. It was the 189th running of the 1000 Guineas.

The winner was Godolphin's Kazzia, a German-bred brown filly trained at Newmarket, Suffolk by Saeed bin Suroor and ridden by Frankie Dettori. Kazzia's victory was the second in the race for her owner, trainer and jockey after the success of Cape Verdi in 1998. Godolphin's leader Sheikh Mohammed had previously won the race with Oh So Sharp in 1985 and Musical Bliss in 1989. Kazzia was the first German-bred horse to win a British Classic.

The contenders
The race attracted a field of seventeen runners, thirteen trained in the United Kingdom and four in Ireland: there were no challengers from continental Europe. The favourite was the Luca Cumani-trained Gossamer who had won the Prestige Stakes and the Fillies' Mile in 2001. The four Irish challengers, all trained by Aidan O'Brien at Ballydoyle were Quarter Moon, winner of the Moyglare Stud Stakes, Lahinch, the winner of the Leopardstown 1,000 Guineas Trial Stakes and the maiden race winners Maryinsky and Pietra Dura. The Godolphin stable was represented by Kazzia, who had not raced since winning the Premio Dormello at Milan in October 2001. Apart from Gossamer, the best of the British-trained runners appeared to be the Nell Gwyn Stakes winner Misterah, the Prix Marcel Boussac winner Sulk and the Michael Stoute-trained Alasha. A notable absentee was Queen's Logic who had been favourite for the race before sustaining an injury. Gossamer headed the betting at odds of 11/8 ahead of Alasha (6/1), Misterah (7/1), Maryinsky (8/1) and Quarter Moon (9/1).

The race
Shortly after the start the fillies formed a single group racing down the stands side (the left side from the jockeys' viewpoint) of the wide Newmarket straight. Kazzia and Roundtree both started quickly, but Lahinch gained the advantage in the early stages and set the pace. Lahinch and Kazzia disputed the lead for most of the way, with Alasha, Maryinsky and Misterah following and the favourite Gossamer restrained at the back of the field. Inside the final quarter-mile Kazzia took the lead from Lahinch as the blinkered outsider Snowfire began to make rapid progress. In the closing stages Kazzia held off the challenges of Snowfire on her right and Alasha on her left to win by a neck and half a length, with the 66/1 shot Dolores taking fourth place ahead of Quarter Moon, Misterah and Lahinch. Gossamer finished eighth after struggling to obtain a clear run and stumbling a furlong from the finish.

After the race, the winning jockey Frankie Dettori said that the filly had done very well, particularly as she was essentially a stayer- "She really wants more than a mile."

Race details
 Sponsor: Sagitta
 First prize: £174,000
 Surface: Turf
 Going: Good to Firm
 Distance: 8 furlongs
 Number of runners: 17
 Winner's time: 1:37.85

Full result

 Abbreviations: nse = nose; nk = neck; shd = head; hd = head; dist = distance; UR = unseated rider; DSQ = disqualified; PU = pulled up

Winner's details
Further details of the winner, Kazzia
 Foaled: 12 April 1999
 Country: Germany
 Sire: Zinaad; Dam: Khoruna (Lagunas)
 Owner: Godolphin
 Breeder: R Grunewald

References

 1000 Guineas
 2002
1000 Guineas
1000 Guineas
2000s in Suffolk